Shakertowne is an unincorporated community and census-designated place (CDP) in Perry County, Missouri, United States. It is in the central part of the county and is bordered to the north by Perryville, the county seat. Interstate 55 forms the western edge of the CDP; the closest access is from Exit 129 (Missouri Route 51) in Perryville.

Shakertowne was first listed as a CDP prior to the 2020 census.

Demographics

References 

Census-designated places in Perry County, Missouri
Census-designated places in Missouri